The Navotas Boulevard Business Park is an under-construction commercial and business center in Navotas. It will rise on  reclaimed land, and has been under-construction since 2019. The development is envisioned to create a mixed-use community with residential, institutional, commercial and industrial areas suitable for port facilities, marine and tourism. Its master plan was designed by Surbana Jurong.

Background

The project was approved by the City Government of Navotas in 2015. It finally gained the Philippine Reclamation Authority in 2018. Fishermen from the city protested against the project, stating that it will displace them and their livelihood.

References

See also
 Land reclamation in Metro Manila
 Bay City
 Horizon Manila
 Manila Solar City
 Pasay Harbor City

Land reclamation in the Philippines
Manila Bay
Districts in Metro Manila
Mixed-use developments in Metro Manila
Planned communities in the Philippines